Hebao Island ( Hebao Dao, literally "Purse Island", variants: Bullock Horn, Ho-pao, Ho-pao Tao, Kukok Island, Kukok Ngao Kok, Niu-chiao-shan and Niu-chio Tao) is a resort island off the southern coast of Guangdong province in the People's Republic of China. Located in the South China Sea, it is approximately 100 kilometers West-Southwest of Hong Kong.

Administratively, this picturesque, sub-tropical island belongs to the prefecture-level city of Zhuhai, and so may be considered part of the so-called Chinese Riviera. It has a total area of 13 square kilometers, and its coast consists mainly of beaches, while the interior includes sub-tropical forest.

Four-mile long Great South beach is the longest on the island.

See also

 Damang Island

References

Islands of Zhuhai
Islands of China
Islands of Guangdong
Uninhabited islands of China